Theocracy is a form of government in which one or more deities are recognized as supreme ruling authorities, giving divine guidance to human intermediaries who manage the government's daily affairs.

Etymology 
The word theocracy originates from the  meaning "the rule of God". This, in turn, derives from θεός (theos), meaning "god", and κρατέω (krateo), meaning "to rule". Thus the meaning of the word in Greek was "rule by god(s)" or human incarnation(s) of god(s).

The term was initially coined by Flavius Josephus in the first century AD to describe the characteristic government of the Jews. Josephus argued that while mankind had developed many forms of rule, most could be subsumed under the following three types: monarchy, oligarchy, and democracy. However, according to Josephus, the government of the Jews was unique. Josephus offered the term "theocracy" to describe this polity in which a god was sovereign and his word was law.

Josephus' definition was widely accepted until the Enlightenment era, when the term took on negative connotations and was barely salvaged by Hegel's commentary. The first recorded English use was in 1622, with the meaning "sacerdotal government under divine inspiration" (as in ancient Israel and Judah); the meaning "priestly or religious body wielding political and civil power" was first recorded in 1825.

Definition 
The term theocracy derives from the Koine Greek , "rule of God", a term used by Josephus for the kingdoms of Israel and Judah, reflecting the view that "God himself is recognized as the head" of the state. The common, generic use of the term, as defined above in terms of rule by a church or analogous religious leadership, may be more accurately described as an ecclesiocracy.

In a pure theocracy, the civil leader is believed to have a personal connection with the deity or deities of that civilization's religion or belief, such as Muhammad's leadership of the early Muslims with prophecies from Allah. In an ecclesiocracy, the religious leaders assume a leading role in the state, but do not claim that they are instruments of divine revelation. 

A related phenomenon is a secular government co-existing with a state religion or delegating some aspects of civil law to religious communities. For example, in Israel, marriage is governed by officially recognized religious bodies who each provide marriage services for their respected adherents, yet no form of civil marriage (free of religion) exists, nor marriage by non-recognized minority religions.

According to Merriam-Webster's Dictionary, there are two meanings for the word "theocracy": (1) government of a state by immediate divine guidance or by officials who are regarded as divinely guided; and (2) a state governed by a theocracy.

Current theocracies

Christian theocracies

Holy See (Vatican City) 

Following the Capture of Rome on 20 September 1870, the Papal States including Rome with the Vatican were annexed by the Kingdom of Italy. In 1929, through the Lateran Treaty signed with the Italian Government, the new state of Vatican City (population 842) was formally created and recognized as an independent state. The head of state of the Vatican is the pope, elected by the College of Cardinals, an assembly of high-ranking clergy. The pope is elected for life, and either dies or may resign. The cardinals are appointed by the popes, who thereby choose the electors of their successors.

Voting is limited to cardinals under 80 years of age. A Secretary for Relations with States, directly responsible for international relations, is appointed by the pope. The Vatican legal system is rooted in canon law and ultimately is decided by the pope; the Bishop of Rome as the Supreme Pontiff "has the fullness of legislative, executive and judicial powers." Although the laws of Vatican City come from the secular laws of Italy, under article 3 of the Law of the Sources of the Law, provision is made for the supplementary application of the "laws promulgated by the Kingdom of Italy".

Mount Athos 

Mount Athos is a mountain peninsula in Greece which is an Eastern Orthodox autonomous area consisting of 20 monasteries under the direct jurisdiction of the Primate of Constantinople. There have been almost 1,800 years of a continuous Christian presence on Mount Athos, and it has a long history of monasteries, which dates back to at least 800 AD. The origin of self-rule at Mount Athos can be traced back to a royal edict issued by the Byzantine Emperor John Tzimisces in 972, and reaffirmed by Emperor Alexios I Komnenos in 1095. Greece wrestled control of the area from the Ottoman Empire during the First Balkan War in 1912. However, it was formally recognized as part of Greece only after a diplomatic dispute with the Russian Empire was no longer an obstacle; after the latter's collapse during World War I.

Mount Athos is specifically exempt from the free movement of people and goods required by Greece's membership of the European Union, and entrance is allowed only with express permission from the monks. The number of daily visitors to Mount Athos is restricted, with all visitors required to obtain an entrance permit. Only men are permitted to visit, and Eastern Orthodox Christians take precedence in the issuing of permits. Residents of Mount Athos must be men aged 18 and over who are members of the Eastern Orthodox Church and also either monks or workers.

Athos is governed jointly by a community consisting of members of the 20 monasteries and a Civil Administrator, appointed by the Greek Ministry of Foreign Affairs. The monastic community is led by the Protos.

Islamic theocracies 

An Islamic republic is the name given to several states that are officially ruled by Islamic laws, including the Islamic Republics of Iran, Pakistan, and Mauritania. Pakistan first adopted the title under the constitution of 1956. Mauritania adopted it on 28 November 1958. Iran adopted it after the 1979 Iranian Revolution that overthrew the Pahlavi dynasty. Afghanistan adopted it in 2004 after the fall of the Taliban government. Despite having similar names, the countries differ greatly in their governments and laws.

The term "Islamic republic" has come to mean several different things, at times contradictory. To some Muslim religious leaders in the Middle East and Africa who advocate it, an Islamic republic is a state under a particular Islamic form of government. They see it as a compromise between a purely Islamic caliphate and secular nationalism and republicanism. In their conception of the Islamic republic, the penal code of the state is required to be compatible with some or all laws of Sharia, and the state may not be a monarchy, as many Middle Eastern states are present.

Afghanistan 
Afghanistan was an Islamic theocracy when the Taliban first ruled Afghanistan from 1996 to 2001 and since their reinstatement of the Islamic Emirate of Afghanistan in 2021, Afghanistan is an Islamic theocracy again.

Spreading from Kandahar, the Taliban eventually captured Kabul in 1996. By the end of 2000, the Taliban controlled 90% of the country, aside from the opposition (Northern Alliance) strongholds which were primarily found in the northeast corner of Badakhshan Province. Areas under the Taliban's direct control were mainly Afghanistan's major cities and highways. Tribal khans and warlords had de facto direct control over various small towns, villages, and rural areas. The Taliban sought to establish law and order and to impose a strict interpretation of Islamic Sharia law, along with the religious edicts of Mullah Mohammed Omar, upon the entire country of Afghanistan.

During the five-year history of the Islamic Emirate, the Taliban regime interpreted the Sharia in accordance with the Hanafi school of Islamic jurisprudence and the religious edicts of Mullah Omar. The Taliban forbade pork and alcohol, many types of consumer technology such as music, television, and film, as well as most forms of art such as paintings or photography, male and female participation in sport, including football and chess; recreational activities such as kite-flying and keeping pigeons or other pets were also forbidden, and the birds were killed according to the Taliban's ruling. Movie theaters were closed and repurposed as mosques. Celebration of the Western and Iranian New Year was forbidden. Taking photographs and displaying pictures or portraits was forbidden, as it was considered by the Taliban as a form of idolatry. Women were banned from working, girls were forbidden to attend schools or universities, were requested to observe purdah and to be accompanied outside their households by male relatives; those who violated these restrictions were punished. Men were forbidden to shave their beards and required to let them grow and keep them long according to the Taliban's liking, and to wear turbans outside their households. Communists were systematically executed. Prayer was made compulsory and those who did not respect the religious obligation after the azaan were arrested. Gambling was banned. Thieves were punished by amputating their hands or feet. In 2000, the Taliban leader Mullah Omar officially banned opium cultivation and drug trafficking in Afghanistan; the Taliban succeeded in nearly eradicating opium production (99%) by 2001. Under the Taliban governance of Afghanistan, both drug users and dealers were severely prosecuted.

Cabinet ministers and deputies were mullahs with a "madrasah education." Several of them, such as the Minister of Health and Governor of the State bank, were primarily military commanders who were ready to leave their administrative posts to fight when needed. Military reverses that trapped them behind lines or led to their deaths increased the chaos in the national administration. At the national level, "all senior Tajik, Uzbek and Hazara bureaucrats" were replaced "with Pashtuns, whether qualified or not." Consequently, the ministries "by and large ceased to function."

Rashid described the Taliban government as "a secret society run by Kandaharis ... mysterious, secretive, and dictatorial." They did not hold elections, as their spokesman explained:

They modeled their decision-making process on the Pashtun tribal council (jirga), together with what they believed to be the early Islamic model. Discussion was followed by a building of a consensus by the "believers". Before capturing Kabul, there was talk of stepping aside once a government of "good Muslims" took power, and law and order were restored.

As the Taliban's power grew, decisions were made by Mullah Omar without consulting the jirga and without consulting other parts of the country. One such instance is the rejection of Loya Jirga decision about expulsion of Osama Bin Laden. Mullah Omar visited the capital, Kabul, only twice while in power. Instead of an election, their leader's legitimacy came from an oath of allegiance ("Bay'ah"), in imitation of the Prophet and the first four Caliphs. On 4 April 1996, Mullah Omar had "the Cloak of Muhammad" taken from its shrine, Kirka Sharif, for the first time in 60 years. Wrapping himself in the relic, he appeared on the roof of a building in the center of Kandahar while hundreds of Pashtun mullahs below shouted "Amir al-Mu'minin!" (Commander of the Faithful), in a pledge of support. Taliban spokesman Mullah Wakil explained:

The Taliban were reluctant to share power, and since their ranks were overwhelmingly Pashtun they ruled as overlords over the 60% of Afghans from other ethnic groups. In local government, such as the Kabul city council or Herat, Taliban loyalists, not locals, dominated, even when the Pashto-speaking Taliban could not communicate with roughly half of the population who spoke Dari or other non-Pashtun tongues. Critics complained that this "lack of local representation in urban administration made the Taliban appear as an occupying force."

Iran 
Iran has been described as a "theocratic republic" by the CIA World Factbook, and its constitution has been described as a "hybrid" of "theocratic and democratic elements" by Francis Fukuyama. Like other Islamic states, it maintains religious laws and has religious courts to interpret all aspects of law. According to Iran's constitution, "all civil, penal, financial, economic, administrative, cultural, military, political, and other laws and regulations must be based on Islamic criteria."

In addition, Iran has a religious ruler and many religious officials in powerful governmental positions. The head of state, or "Supreme Leader", is a faqih (scholar of Islamic law) and has more power than the president of Iran. The Leader appoints the heads of many powerful governmental positions: the commanders of the armed forces, the director of the national radio and television network, the heads of powerful major religious and economic foundations, the chief justice of Iran, the attorney general (indirectly through the chief justice), special tribunals, and members of the supreme national security council who are dealing with defense and foreign affairs. He also co-appoints the 12 jurists of the Guardian Council.

The Leader is elected by the Assembly of Experts which is made up of mujtahids, who are Islamic scholars competent in interpreting Sharia.

The Guardian Council, has the power to reject bills passed by the Parliament. It can also approve or reject candidates who want to run for the Presidency, Parliament, and the Assembly of Experts. The council supervises elections, and can allow or ban investigations into elections. Six of the twelve council members are faqih and have the power to approve or reject all bills passed by the Parliament; Whether the faqih believes that the bill is in accordance with Islamic laws and customs (Sharia) or not. The other six members are lawyers appointed by the chief justice, who is a cleric and appointed by the Leader.

Saudi Arabia 

In the Basic Law of Saudi Arabia, Saudi Arabia defines itself as a sovereign Arab Islamic state with Islam as its official religion. However, some critiques describe Saudi Arabia as an Islamic theocracy. Religious minorities do not have the right to practice their religion openly. Conversion from Islam to another religion is punishable by death as apostasy. Muhammad Al-Atawneh describes the current Saudi regime as a ‘theo-monarchy, that draws power from long-standing religio-cultural norms.'

Jewish theocracies

Israel 
Israel describes itself as a Jewish state. Israel recognizes by law the Chief Rabinate of Israel as the supreme rabbinic authority for Judaism in Israel. Gail Page describes Israel as a "theocracy", a "country that has openly declared itself for a particular religious group". On July 2019, the Israeli Knesset voted to pass the nation-state law which declares Israel as the nation-state of the Jewish people; Haidar Eid thus describes Israel as an ethno-religious state.

Central Tibetan Administration 
The Central Tibetan Administration, colloquially known as the Tibetan government in exile, is a Tibetan exile organization with a state-like internal structure. According to its charter, the position of head of state of the Central Tibetan Administration belongs ex officio to the Dalai Lama, a religious hierarch. In this respect, it continues the traditions of the former government of Tibet, which was ruled by the Dalai Lamas and their ministers, with a specific role reserved for a class of monk officials.

On 14 March 2011, at the 14th Dalai Lama's suggestion, the parliament of the Central Tibetan Administration began considering a proposal to remove the Dalai Lama's role as head of state in favor of an elected leader.

The first directly elected Kalön Tripa was Samdhong Rinpoche, who was elected on 20 August 2001.

Before 2011, the Kalön Tripa position was subordinate to the 14th Dalai Lama who presided over the government in exile from its founding. In August of that year, Lobsang Sangay received 55 percent of 49,189 votes, defeating his nearest rival Tethong Tenzin Namgyal by 8,646 votes, becoming the second popularly elected Kalon Tripa. The Dalai Lama announced that his political authority would be transferred to Sangay.

Change to Sikyong 
On 20 September 2012, the 15th Tibetan Parliament-in-Exile unanimously voted to change the title of Kalön Tripa to Sikyong in Article 19 of the Charter of the Tibetans in exile and relevant articles. The Dalai Lama had previously referred to the Kalon Tripa as Sikyong, and this usage was cited as the primary justification for the name change. According to Tibetan Review, "Sikyong" translates to "political leader", as distinct from "spiritual leader". Foreign affairs Kalon Dicki Chhoyang stated that the term "Sikyong" has had a precedent dating back to the 7th Dalai Lama, and that the name change "ensures historical continuity and legitimacy of the traditional leadership from the Fifth Dalai Lama". The online Dharma Dictionary translates sikyong (srid skyong) as "secular ruler; regime, regent". The title sikyong had previously been used by regents who ruled Tibet during the Dalai Lama's minority.

States with official state religions 

Having a state religion is not sufficient enough to mean that a state is a theocracy in the narrow sense of the term. Many countries have a state religion without the government directly deriving its powers from a divine authority or a religious authority which is directly exercising governmental powers. Since few theocracies exist in the modern world, the word "theocracy" is now used as a descriptive term for a government which enforces a state religion.

States with an ambiguous status

North Korea 

Although North Korea is a socialist republic where the government's official state ideology is Juche which centers around the Kim family. According to Ashley J. Tellis and Michael Wills, this amendment to the preamble was an indication of the unique North Korean characteristic of being a theocratic state based on the personality cult surrounding Kim Il-sung. Kim Il-sung, who died in 1994, remains North Korea's "Eternal President" and the country adopted a Juche calendar dating from 1912, the year of Kim's birth.

Historic states with theocratic aspects

Sumer 
Sumerian cities during the Uruk period were probably theocratic and were most likely headed by a priest-king (ensi), assisted by a council of elders including both men and women.

Ancient Egypt 
Ancient Egyptian pharaohs were seen as divine and associated with Horus, and after death, Osiris. While not considered equal to other members of the Egyptian pantheon, the pharaoh was seen as having the responsibility of mediating between the gods and the people.

Japan 
The emperor was historically venerated as the descendant of the Shinto sun goddess Amaterasu. Through this line of descent, the emperor was seen as a living god who was the supreme leader of the Japanese people. This status only changed with the Occupation of Japan following the end of the Second World War when Emperor Hirohito was forced to declare that he was not a living god in order for Japan to reorganize into a democratic nation.

Israel 
 
In biblical times, Early Israel was a Kritarchy, ruled by Judges before instituting a monarchy. The Judges were believed to be representatives of YHWH (Yahweh).

Rome 

The Imperial cult of ancient Rome identified Roman emperors and some members of their families with the divinely sanctioned authority (auctoritas) of the Roman State. The official offer of cultus to a living emperor acknowledged his office and rule as divinely approved and constitutional: his Principate should therefore demonstrate pious respect for traditional republican deities and mores.

Tibet 
Unified religious rule in Buddhist Tibet began in 1642, when the Fifth Dalai Lama allied with the military power of the Mongol Gushri Khan to consolidate the political power and center control around his office as head of the Gelug school. This form of government is known as the dual system of government. Prior to 1642, particular monasteries and monks had held considerable power throughout Tibet but had not achieved anything approaching complete control, though power continued to be held in a diffuse, feudal system after the ascension of the Fifth Dalai Lama. Power in Tibet was held by a number of traditional elites, including members of the nobility, the heads of the major Buddhist sects (including their various tulkus), and various large and influential monastic communities.

The Bogd Khanate period of Mongolia (1911–19) is also cited as a former Buddhist theocracy.

China 

Similar to the Roman Emperor, the Chinese sovereign was historically held to be the Son of Heaven. However, from the first historical Emperor on, this was largely ceremonial and tradition quickly established it as a posthumous dignity, like the Roman institution. The situation before Qin Shi Huang Di is less clear.

The Shang dynasty essentially functioned as a theocracy, declaring the ruling family the sons of heaven and calling the chief sky god Shangdi after a word for their deceased ancestors. After their overthrow by the Zhou, the royal clan of Shang were not eliminated but instead moved to a ceremonial capital where they were charged to continue the performance of their rituals.

The titles combined by Shi Huangdi to form his new title of emperor were originally applied to god-like beings who ordered the heavens and earth and to culture heroes credited with the invention of agriculture, clothing, music, astrology, etc. Even after the fall of Qin, an emperor's words were considered sacred edicts and his written proclamations "directives from above".

As a result, some Sinologists translate the title huangdi (usually rendered "emperor") as thearch. The term properly refers to the head of a thearchy (a kingdom of gods), but the more specific "theocrat" carries associations of a strong priesthood that would be generally inaccurate in describing imperial China. Others reserve the use of "thearch" to describe the legendary figures of Chinese prehistory while continuing to use "emperor" to describe historical rulers.

The Heavenly Kingdom of Great Peace in 1860s Qing China was a heterodox Christian theocracy led by a person who said that he was the younger brother of Jesus Christ, Hong Xiuquan. This theocratic state fought one of the most destructive wars in history, the Taiping Rebellion, against the Qing dynasty for fifteen years before being crushed following the fall of the rebel capital Nanjing.

Caliphate 

The Sunni branch of Islam stipulates that, as a head of state, a Caliph should be selected or elected by Muslims or their representatives. Followers of Shia Islam, however, believe a Caliph should be an Imam chosen by God from the Ahl al-Bayt (the "Family of the House", Muhammad's direct descendants).

Byzantine Empire 

The Byzantine Empire ( 324–1453) operated under Symphonia, meaning that the emperor was both the head of civil society and the ultimate authority over the ecclesiastical authorities, the patriarchates. The emperor was considered to be God's omnipotent representative on earth and he ruled as an absolute autocrat.

Jennifer Fretland VanVoorst argues, "the Byzantine Empire became a theocracy in the sense that Christian values and ideals were the foundation of the empire's political ideals and heavily entwined with its political goals". Steven Runciman says in his book on The Byzantine Theocracy (2004):

Münster (16th century) 
Between 1533 and 1535 the Protestant leaders Jan Mattys and John of Leiden erected a short-living theocratic kingdom in the city of Münster. They created an Anabaptist regime with chiliastic and millenarian expectations. Money was abolished and any violations of the Ten Commandments were punished by death. Despite the pietistic ideology, polygamy was allowed and von Leiden had 17 wives. In 1535, Münster was recaptured by Franz von Waldeck, ending the existence of the kingdom.

Geneva and Zurich (16th century) 
Historians debate the extent to which Geneva, Switzerland, in the days of John Calvin (1509–64) was a theocracy. On the one hand, Calvin's theology clearly called for separation between church and state. Other historians have stressed the enormous political power wielded on a daily basis by the clerics.

In nearby Zurich, Switzerland, Protestant reformer Huldrych Zwingli (1484-1531) built a political system that many scholars have called a theocracy, while others have denied it.

Deseret (LDS Church, USA) 

The question of theocracy has been debated extensively by historians regarding the Latter-Day Saint communities in Illinois, and especially in Utah.

Joseph Smith, mayor of Nauvoo, Illinois and founder of the Latter Day Saint movement, ran as an independent for president in 1844. He proposed the redemption of slaves by selling public lands, reducing the size and salary of Congress, the closure of prisons, the annexation of Texas, Oregon, and parts of Canada, the securing of international rights on high seas, free trade, and the re-establishment of a national bank. His top aide Brigham Young campaigned for Smith saying, "He it is that God of Heaven designs to save this nation from destruction and preserve the Constitution." The campaign ended when Smith was killed by a mob while in the Carthage, Illinois, jail on June 27, 1844.

After severe persecution, the Mormons left the United States and resettled in a remote part of what is now Utah, which was then part of Mexico. However the United States took control in 1848 and would not accept polygamy. The Mormon State of Deseret was short-lived. Its original borders stretched from western Colorado to the southern California coast. When the Mormons arrived in the valley of the Great Salt Lake in 1847, the Great Basin was still a part of Mexico and had no secular government. As a result, Brigham Young administered the region both spiritually and temporally through the highly organized and centralized Melchizedek Priesthood. This original organization was based upon a concept called theodemocracy, a governmental system combining biblical theocracy with mid-19th-century American political ideals.

In 1849, the Saints organized a secular government in Utah, although many ecclesiastical leaders maintained their positions of secular power. The Mormons also petitioned Congress to have Deseret admitted into the Union as a state. However, under the Compromise of 1850, Utah Territory was created and Brigham Young was appointed governor. In this situation, Young still stood as head of The Church of Jesus Christ of Latter-day Saints (LDS Church) as well as of Utah's secular government.

After the abortive Utah War of 1857–1858, the replacement of Young by an outside Federal Territorial Governor, intense federal prosecution of LDS Church leaders, the eventual resolution of controversies regarding plural marriage, and accession by Utah to statehood, the apparent temporal aspects of LDS theodemocracy receded markedly.

Persia/Iran 
During the Achaemenid Empire, Zoroastrianism was the state religion and included formalized worship. The Persian kings were known to be pious Zoroastrians and they ruled with a Zoroastrian form of law called asha. However, Cyrus the Great, who founded the empire, avoided imposing the Zoroastrian faith on the inhabitants of conquered territory. Cyrus's kindness towards Jews has been cited as sparking Zoroastrian influence on Judaism.

Under the Seleucids, Zoroastrianism became autonomous. During the Sassanid period, the Zoroastrian calendar was reformed, image-use in worship was banned, Fire Temples were increasingly built, and intolerance towards other faiths prevailed.

Florence under Savonarola 
The short reign (1494–1498) of Girolamo Savonarola, a Dominican priest, over the city of Florence had features of a theocracy. During his rule, "unchristian" books, statues, poetry, and other items were burned (in the Bonfire of the Vanities), sodomy was made a capital offense, and other Christian practices became law.

Prince-Bishopric of Montenegro 
The Prince-Bishopric of Montenegro was an ecclesiastical principality that existed from 1516 until 1852. The principality was located around modern-day Montenegro. It emerged from the Eparchy of Cetinje, later known as the Metropolitanate of Montenegro and the Littoral, whose bishops defied the Ottoman Empire overlordship and transformed the parish of Cetinje into a de facto theocracy, ruling it as Metropolitans (Vladike, also known as prince-bishops). The first prince-bishop was Vavila. The system was transformed into a hereditary one by Danilo Šćepčević, a bishop of Cetinje who united the several tribes of Montenegro into fighting the Ottoman Empire that had occupied all of Montenegro (as the Sanjak of Montenegro and Montenegro Vilayet) and most of southeastern Europe at the time.

See also 

 General:
 Autocracy
 Clericalism
 Clerical fascism
 Collectivism
 Divine law
 Divine command theory
 Fundamentalism
 Philosopher king
 Religious law
 Religion
 Nontheistic religion
 Christian:
 Christian fascism
 Christian fundamentalism
 Christian Identity
 Christian reconstructionism
 Christian right
 Cuius regio, eius religio
 Divine Right of Kings
 Dominionism
 Integralism
 National Catholicism
 Temporal power (papal)
 Theonomy
 Islamic:
 Iranian Revolution
 Islamic banking
 Islamic fundamentalism
 Islamic republic
 Islamic state
 Islamism
 Islamofascism
 Khomeinism
 Political aspects of Islam
 Religious police
 Qutbism
 Salafism
 Taliban
 Jewish:
 Jewish fundamentalism
 Kahanism
 Halachic state
 Kach and Kahane Chai 
 Others:
 Devaraja
 Divine right of kings
 Hindu law
 Khalistan
 State Shinto (Japan)
 State religion
 Fictional:
 Religion in science fiction

References

Further reading 
 
 Hirschl, Ran. Constitutional Theocracy. Harvard University Press, 2010. .
  Baslez, Marie-Françoise and Schwentzel, Christian-Georges.Les dieux et le pouvoir: aux origines de la théocratie. Presses Universitaires de Rennes, 2016. .

External links 

Biblical Theocracy, etext of a book by Stephen Palmquist (Philopsychy Press, 1993).
Dominionism, sacralism and theocracy – Rachel Tabachnik, Dr. John MacArthur, Dr. Martin Erdmann, Rudolf Ebertshäuser, Sarah Leslie, Discernment Ministries Inc. u.v.m, Eds (English + German)
Freedom of Religion in Israel 
"Is Judaism a Theocracy?"

Authoritarianism
 
Oligarchy
Religion and government
Right-wing politics
Religion
Religious studies
Religion and politics